Orhun is a Turkish masculine given name and a surname. People with the name include:

Given name

 Orhun Ene (born 1967), Turkish basketball player

Surname
 Deniz Orhun (born 1974), Turkish chef, media personality and businesswoman

See also
 Orkhon, disambiguation page

Turkish masculine given names
Surnames of Turkish origin